Marjorie Ogilvie Anderson (née Cunningham) (9 February 1909 – 27 May 2002) was a Scottish historian and paleographer.

Early years
Born Marjorie Ogilvie Cunningham in St Andrews, she attended St Leonards School there before studying English at Lady Margaret Hall, Oxford University.

Career
After graduation she joined Alan Orr Anderson, whose eyesight was failing, as his paleographer and assistant. They married in 1932. Alan Anderson died in 1958, but Mrs Anderson continued to publish on early Scottish subjects, most notably her Kings and Kingship in Early Scotland and her revision of Early Sources of Scottish History, the standard collection of source material on Scottish History to 1286, written by Alan Anderson and first published in 1922.

Honours
Mrs Anderson received an honorary DLitt from the University of Saint Andrews in 1973. A festschrift in her honour was published in 2000.

Death
She died in 2002.

Select bibliography
 (editor) Anderson, Alan Orr, Scottish Annals from English Chroniclers: AD 500–1286, 2nd edition, Stamford, 1990.
 (with Alan Orr Anderson) Adomnan's Life of Columba, Edinburgh 1961 (revised Oxford, 1991)
 (with Alan Orr Anderson) The Chronicle of Holyrood, Edinburgh, 1938.
 Kings and Kingship in Early Scotland, Edinburgh, 1973 (revised Edinburgh, 1980)

References
 Taylor, Simon, "Introduction" and "Bibliography of Marjorie Ogilvie Anderson" in Taylor (ed.), op. cit.
 Taylor, Simon, "The Anderson Century: 100 years of Early Medieval Scottish Historical Study" in History Scotland, Volume 2, Number 6 (November/December 2002).
 Watt, D.E.R., "Dr Marjorie Ogilvie Anderson: A tribute" in Simon Taylor (ed.), Kings, clerics and chronicles in Scotland 500–1297: Essays in honour of Marjorie Ogilvie Anderson on the occasion of her ninetieth birthday. Four Courts, Dublin, 2000. 

1909 births
2002 deaths
People educated at St Leonards School
Alumni of Lady Margaret Hall, Oxford
20th-century Scottish historians
Scottish antiquarians
British women historians
20th-century British women writers
20th-century antiquarians